Euphorbia stenoclada is a species of plant in the family Euphorbiaceae. It is native to Madagascar and the Mozambique Channel Islands (Europa Island).  Its natural habitats are subtropical or tropical dry forests, subtropical or tropical dry shrubland, and rocky areas. It is threatened by habitat loss.

References

stenoclada
Flora of Madagascar
Flora of the Mozambique Channel Islands
Flora of the Madagascar spiny thickets
Trees of Madagascar
Least concern plants
Taxonomy articles created by Polbot
Taxa named by Henri Ernest Baillon
Flora of the Madagascar subhumid forests